Facies diaphragmatica or diaphragmatic surface can refer to:
 Diaphragmatic surface of heart (facies diaphragmatica cordis)
 Diaphragmatic surface of lung (facies diaphragmatica pulmonis)
 Diaphragmatic surface of liver (facies diaphragmatica hepatis)
 Diaphragmatic surface of spleen (facies diaphragmatica splenica)